For the Second Time is a 1975 studio album by Count Basie, with bassist Ray Brown and drummer Louie Bellson, the sequel to their 1974 album For the First Time.

Track listing
"Sandman" (Count Basie, Ray Brown) – 5:48
"If I Could Be with You (One Hour Tonight)" (Henry Creamer, James P. Johnson) – 4:05
"Draw" (Basie, Brown) – 3:38
"On the Sunny Side of the Street" (Dorothy Fields, Jimmy McHugh) – 5:24
"The One I Love (Belongs to Somebody Else)" (Isham Jones, Gus Kahn) – 4:49
"Blues for Eric" (Basie, Brown) – 6:27
"I Surrender Dear" (Harry Barris, Gordon Clifford) – 4:59
"Racehorse" (Basie, Brown) – 3:23

Personnel
 Count Basie - piano
 Ray Brown - double bass
 Louie Bellson - drums

References

1975 albums
Count Basie albums
Pablo Records albums
Albums produced by Norman Granz